The yellow-throated sandgrouse (Pterocles gutturalis) is a species of bird in the family Pteroclidae.

Range
It is found in Angola, Botswana, Eritrea, Ethiopia, Kenya, Namibia, South Africa, Tanzania, Zambia, and Zimbabwe.

Subspecies
There are two accepted subspecies:
 P. g. subsp. saturatior E.J.O.Hartert, 1900 – Ethiopia to northern Zambia
 P. g. subsp. gutturalis A. Smith, 1836 – southern Zambia and Angola to northern South Africa

Gallery

References

External links
 Yellow-throated sandgrouse - Species text in The Atlas of Southern African Birds.

Pterocles
Birds of East Africa
Birds of Southern Africa
Birds described in 1836
Taxonomy articles created by Polbot